Norrbotten Wing, also F 21 Luleå, or simply F 21, is a Swedish Air Force wing with the main base located in Luleå Airport in northern Sweden.  It is one of the three remaining wings in Sweden and currently has two squadrons of multirole aircraft. F 21 in the north and F 17 in the south are the two wings remaining to have operational squadrons. F 7 is a school where pilots begin their training in the JAS 39 Gripen. Once completed the pilot's training is moved out to the two operational wings where they acquire their final training.

History
Parts of the Swedish helicopter forces are today stationed at F 21 with MEDEVAC in subarctic climate as its main task. The wing uses the coat of arms of Luleå as the emblem. F 21 currently operates two HKP 10B in Afghanistan.

F 21 figures in the crime novel The Red Wolf by Liza Marklund.

Current fleet:
 JAS 39 Gripen
 NHIndustries NH90 (HKP 14)

Heraldry and traditions

Coat of arms
The unit's first coat of arms, used by the Royal Norrbotten Air Base Corps was used from 1941 to 1963. Blazon: "Azure, powdered with estoiles or, the provincial badge of Västerbotten, a reindeer courant argent, armed and langued gules". The unit's second coat of arms, used by Norrbotten Wing, was used from 1963 to 1994. Blazon: "Argent, the town badge of Luleå, two keys azure in saltire, sinister inverted." The current coat of arms has been used since 1994. Blazon: "Argent, the town badge of Luleå, two keys azure in saltire, sinister inverted, a chief azure charged with a winged two-bladed propeller or".

Colours, standards and guidons
The colour was presented to the then Royal Norrbotten Air Base Corps (F 21) at Barkarby by His Majesty the King Gustaf V on 17 September 1944. The colour is drawn by Brita Grep and embroidered by hand in insertion technique by the company Libraria. Blazon: "On blue cloth in the centre the badge of the Air Force; a winged two-bladed propeller under a royal crown proper, all in yellow. In the first corner the town badge of Luleå; two white keys in saltire, the left inverted." On 2 September 2014 His Majesty the King Carl XVI Gustaf presented a new colour to wing commander colonel Fredrik Bergman. As a tradition-bearing unit of previously disbanded wings, the new colour added traditional heritage from Jämtland Wing (F 4) and Hälsinge Wing (F 15) in the form of each county's coat of arms. The town badge of Luleå, two white keys in saltire can also be found in the new colour.

Medals
In 1996, the Norrbottens flygflottiljs (F 21) förtjänstmedalj ("Norrbotten Wing (F 21) Medal of Merit") in gold (NorrbffljGM) of the 8th size was established. The medal ribbon is blue with red edges and a yellow stripe on the middle.

Commanding officers
From 1941 to 1963, the commanding officers was referred to as kårchef ("corps commander") and had the rank of lieutenant colonel. From 1942, the corps commander had the rank of colonel. From 1942 to 1957, the commanding officer of F 21 was also commanding officer of Upper Norrland Air Base Area (Övre Norrlands flygbasområde, Flybo ÖN). When the wing organization was introduced in 1963, the commanding officer was referred to as flottiljchef ("wing commander"), and had the rank of colonel. From 1976 to 1994, the wing commander was referred to as sektorflottiljchef ("sector wing commander") and had the rank of senior colonel. From 1 July 1994, the commanding officer is again referred to as flottiljchef ("wing commander"), and has the rank of colonel.

Corps, wing and sector wing commanders

1941–1942: Fredrik Adilz
1942–1946: Gösta von Porat
1946–1951: Lars-Erik Tornberg
1951–1957: Hugo Svenow
1957–1959: Gunnar Lindberg
1959–1965: Bengt Bellander
1965–1966: Jan Oterdahl
1966–1969: Tord Norlin
1969–1976: Rune Larsson
1976–1980: Hans Hansson
1980–1982: Lars-Bertil Persson
1982–1984: Bert Stenfeldt
1984–1987: Carl-Johan Rundberg
1987–1991: Roland Magndahl
1991–1993: Kent Harrskog
1993–1994: Curt Westberg
1994–1998: Roland Sterner
1998–2001: Frank Fredriksson
2002–2005: Jan Otterström
2005–2008: Lars Jäderblom
2008–2011: Per Nilsson
2011–2015: Fredrik Bergman
2015–2018: Carl-Johan Edström
2018–2021: Claes Isoz
2021–: Carl-Fredrik Edström

Deputy sector wing commanders
In order to relieve the sector wing commander, a deputy sector wing commander position was added in 1975. Its task was to lead the unit procurement, a task largely similar to the old wing commander position. Hence he was also referred to as flottiljchef ("wing commander"). The deputy sector wing commander had the rank of colonel. On 30 June 1993, the deputy sector wing commander position was terminated.

1975–1976: Hans Hansson
1977–1979: Bror Larsson
1980–1984: Carl-Johan Rundberg
1984–1988: Karl-Göte Widén
1988–1990: Kent Harrskog
1990–1993: ?

Names, designations and locations

Footnotes

References

Notes

Print

Web

Further reading

External links

Wings of the Swedish Air Force
Military units and formations established in 1941
Luleå Municipality
1941 establishments in Sweden